W. Thomas Andrews (November 8, 1941 - September 14, 2009) was an American politician from Pennsylvania who served as a Republican member of the Pennsylvania State Senate for the 21st district from 1973 to 1980.

Early life and education
Andrews was born November 8, 1941 in New Castle, Pennsylvania to Ralph and Mary Andrews.  He graduated from Mohawk High School in 1959 and received a B.A. degree from the College of Wooster in 1963 and a L.L.B from the University of Pittsburgh School of Law in 1966.

Career
He was admitted to the state bar association in 1966 and began private law practice.  He served as district attorney for Lawrence County from 1970 to 1972.  He served in the Pennsylvania Senate for the 21st district from 1973 to 1980.

After his service in the state Senate, he returned to private practice and became a certified financial planner.

References

External links
 

1941 births
2009 deaths
20th-century American politicians
College of Wooster alumni
County district attorneys in Pennsylvania
Pennsylvania lawyers
Republican Party Pennsylvania state senators
People from New Castle, Pennsylvania
University of Pittsburgh School of Law alumni
20th-century American lawyers